The Flower Book is a compilation album by the French singer/songwriter Émilie Simon. Released only in the US and Canada, this album takes from all her previous works, and adds two new versions of songs, “I Wanna Be Your Dog (Remix)” and “Desert (English Version) ”.

Track listing
“Song Of The Storm” from La Marche de l'Empereur
“I Wanna Be Your Dog”
“Dame De Lotus” from Végétal
“Désert” (English version)
“Fleur De Saison” from Végétal
“Le Vieil Amant” from Végétal
“Sweet Blossom” from Végétal
“Rose Hybride De Thé” from Végétal
“Never Fall In Love” from Végétal
“Flowers” from Émilie Simon
“Il Pleut” from Émilie Simon
“Swimming”  from Végétal
“In The Lake” from Végétal
“My Old Friend” from Végétal
“To The Dancers In The Rain” from Émilie Simon

Émilie Simon albums
2005 compilation albums